Zero History is a novel by William Gibson published in 2010. It concludes the informal trilogy begun by Pattern Recognition (2003) and continued by Spook Country (2007), and features the characters Hollis Henry and Milgrim from the latter novel as its protagonists.

Plot
Hollis Henry and Milgrim find themselves in London working for Hubertus Bigend, unaware that their lives previously crossed in Spook Country. One of Bigend's current interests is fashion, particularly the intersection between streetwear, workwear and military clothing.  Milgrim is sent to South Carolina to take photographs of a pair of Army BDUs where he gains the notice of a federal agent named Winnie Tung Whittaker employed by DCIS.  Winnie photographs Milgrim and intimidates him into working as an informant.

Bigend asks Henry and Milgrim to investigate a secret brand, named Gabriel Hounds after the English legend. At the same time, he becomes aware that a coup is being plotted within his company, Blue Ant.  When Milgrim realizes his cell phone is being tracked by rogue elements in Blue Ant, he slides the phone into a pram belonging to the moll of a member of the Russian mob, which leads to one of the mercenaries involved in the coup, who followed the pram, being captured and beaten.  Revenge against Milgrim then becomes the top priority of the mercs.

A parallel subplot follows Hollis as she tracks down the Gabriel Hounds designer.  Joined by her boyfriend Garreth, the mysterious daredevil featured in Spook Country who had been severely injured in a BASE jump, Hollis Henry offers to help Bigend gain the release of Bobby Chombo, who has been captured by the mercenaries to force Bigend to swap him for Milgrim, but as part of the deal, Bigend must allow the Hounds designer to remain anonymous.  Garreth, because of his knowledge of tradecraft, assists Hollis in this, and in doing so calls in favors from an old man, implied to be the same person Garreth worked with in Spook Country (who, via implication in both books, might be Cayce Pollard's father), to help ensure secrecy. Bobby Chombo is critical to Bigend's plan to gain the ability to foresee stock market prices by a number of minutes. Events reach a climax at night in Wormwood Scrubs (an open space in London) where the mercs demand the prisoner exchange take place.

Collaboration
Gibson acknowledges the help of other authors:
Cory Doctorow provided the description of a smartphone.
Bruce Sterling provided the concept of a T-shirt that is not recorded by CCTV.

References

External links
Zero History at WilliamGibsonBooks.com (official website)
"Prepare for ZERO HISTORY by William Gibson", excerpts from the novel read by the author accompanied by promotional images at YouTube
Portal of Reviews of Zero History

2010 American novels
Novels by William Gibson
2010 speculative fiction novels
Novels set in London
Techno-thriller novels
Viking Press books